Ashington is a town in Northumberland, England.

Ashington may also refer to:

a place in the United Kingdom:
 Ashington, Dorset
 Ashington, Somerset
 Ashington, West Sussex
 Ashington End, a village in Lincolnshire
 Ashingdon, a village in Essex with a similar pronunciation.